Enakkoru Magan Pirappan is a 1996 Indian Tamil-language comedy film directed by Keyaar and produced by Pyramid Natarajan. The film stars Ramki, Khushbu, Vivek, Anju Aravind and Vadivukkarasi. It is a remake of the Malayalam film Aadyathe Kanmani. The film was released on 15 August 1996.

Plot 

Ranganayaki, a rich women, has three sons: Gopi, Madhu and Balu. She desperately wants a grandson and will pass on her whole inheritance to her son who has a male child. The elder sons have only daughters and Balu is still a bachelor.

Balu is a singer for marriage functions and he falls in love with Swathi, a girl from a middle-class family. He marries her and Swathi becomes pregnant. Balu's best friend, Raja, an honest journalist, is married to Shanthi and his wife is also pregnant. Swathi and Shanthi deliver babies the same day. Balu has a daughter and Raja has a son.

In the meantime, Ranganayaki has a severe heart attack and the doctor says not to reveal shock news. In the hospital, a misunderstanding happens and Balu's father shows Raja's son to Ranganayaki in a serious condition. Ranganayaki immediately recovers. Balu maintains the lie to save his mother's life. What transpires next forms the rest of the story.

Cast 
Ramki as Balu
Khushbu as Swathi
Vivek as Raja
Anju Aravind as Shanthi
Vadivukkarasi as Ranganayaki
R. Sundarrajan as Sivaraman
Senthil as Muthu
Vennira Aadai Moorthy as Ranganayaki's father
Vinu Chakravarthy as JK
Chinni Jayanth as Madhu
Pandu as Gopi
Thyagu as Verghese

Production 
Pyramid Natarajan who faced losses after producing Love Birds, requested Keyaar to make a film for him within a short time. Anju Aravind was signed to portray a role in the film, anticipating that she would be paired opposite the actor Ramesh Aravind. However, the actor later pulled out and was replaced by the comedian Vivek. This was one of Vivek's earliest full-length supporting roles, as opposed to being restricted to the comedy subplot. According to Keyaar, the filming was completed within 32 days.

Soundtrack 
The music was composed by Karthik Raja, with lyrics written by Arunmozhi and Ilandevan. It is the second film for Karthik Raja as a full-fledged composer.

Release and reception 
Enakkoru Magan Pirappan was released on 15 August 1996, and played for 10 weeks in theatres. R. P. R. of Kalki praised the film's humour and that its unnecessary to find logic while calling Vivek's performance as lifeline for the film but panned the cinematography and editing. The character Verghese, portrayed by Thyagu, became popular in memes.

References

External links 
 
 

1990s Tamil-language films
1996 comedy films
1996 films
Films directed by Keyaar
Films scored by Karthik Raja
Indian comedy films
Tamil remakes of Malayalam films